Austria participated in the Eurovision Song Contest 2005 with the song "Y así" written by Christof Spörk and Edi Köhldorfer. The song was performed by the group Global Kryner. The Austrian broadcaster Österreichischer Rundfunk (ORF) organised the national final Song.Null.Fünf in order to select the Austrian entry for the 2005 contest in Kyiv, Ukraine. Five artists and ten songs competed in a televised show where a public vote consisting of regional televoting and mobile phone voting exclusively selected "Y así" performed by Global Kryner as the winner.

Austria competed in the semi-final of the Eurovision Song Contest, which took place on 19 May 2005. Performing as the opening entry for the show in position 1, "Y así" was not announced among the top 10 entries of the semi-final and therefore did not qualify to compete in the final. It was later revealed that Austria placed twenty-first out of the 25 participating countries in the semi-final with 30 points.

Background

The Austrian national broadcaster, Österreichischer Rundfunk (ORF), broadcasts the event within Austria and organises the selection process for the nation's entry. ORF confirmed their intentions to participate at the 2005 Eurovision Song Contest on 17 September 2004. From 1995 to 2000, ORF has held an internal selection to choose the artist and song to represent Austria at the contest, while the broadcaster had set up national finals with several artists to choose both the song and performer to compete at Eurovision for Austria from 2002 to 2004. Along with their participation confirmation, the broadcaster also announced that the Austrian entry for the 2005 contest would be selected through a national final.

Before Eurovision

Song.Null.Fünf 
Song.Null.Fünf (Song.Zero.Five) was the national final that selected Austria's entry for the Eurovision Song Contest 2005. The competition took place on 25 February 2005 at the ORF Center in Vienna, hosted by Mirjam Weichselbraun and Christian Clerici and broadcast on ORF eins. The national final was watched by 630,000 viewers in Austria.

Format 
Five artists with two songs each competed in the competition where the winner was selected by exclusively by public voting. Viewers were able to cast their votes via landline and the voting results of each of the nine Federal States of Austria created an overall ranking from which points from 1-8, 10 and 12 were distributed. Viewers were also able to vote from mobiles via telephone or SMS and the overall ranking of the entries was also assigned scores from 1-8, 10 and 12. After the combination of all scores, the entry with the highest number of points was selected as the winner.

Competing entries 
ORF invited all interested artists with a contract to a record company to apply to the broadcaster between 17 September 2004 and 30 September 2004. All applications were reviewed by a team of music professionals who nominated four artists to each submit two songs for the national final. On 20 October 2004, DJ Ötzi revealed that he had initially been selected for the competition but later withdrew after issues with creating his two candidate Eurovision songs. An additional artist was nominated by the talent scout organisation Projekt Pop after an additional submission period was opened for interested artists without a contract to a record company to submit two songs to the organisation between 4 November 2004 and 25 November 2004. The five artists and songs were revealed on 5 January 2005 and among the competing artists was former Austrian Eurovision representative Alf Poier who represented Austria in the Eurovision Song Contest 2003.

Final 
The televised final took place on 25 February 2005. Each of the five artists competed with two songs where regional televoting and mobile phone voting selected "Y así" performed by Global Kryner as the winner.

Controversy 
The national final caused controversy due to the format that was amended shortly before the show (the original format was to include two rounds of public voting where one song per artist would be selected in the first round to advance to the second round). When the results were published, 80% of the 337,179 votes registered were submitted via mobiles but distributed just as many points as each federal state did. It was also revealed that "Good Old Europe Is Dying" performed by Alf Poier received the most overall votes (45,000 votes more than "Y así") but placed second due to the voting system. Poier's manager René Berto stated: "We prefer to be the moral winner rather than winning a cheap victory. Global Kryner did not win because of the fans, but because of ORF's last-minute change of the voting system."

At Eurovision
According to Eurovision rules, all nations with the exceptions of the host country, the "Big Four" (France, Germany, Spain and the United Kingdom), and the ten highest placed finishers in the 2004 contest are required to qualify from the semi-final on 19 May 2005 in order to compete for the final on 21 May 2005; the top ten countries from the semi-final progress to the final. On 22 March 2005, a special allocation draw was held which determined the running order for the semi-final and Austria was set to open the show and perform in position 1, before the entry from Lithuania. At the end of the show, Austria was not announced among the top 10 entries in the semi-final and therefore failed to qualify to compete in the final. It was later revealed that Austria placed twenty-first in the semi-final, receiving a total of 30 points.

The semi-final and the final were broadcast in Austria on ORF 2 with commentary by Andi Knoll and via radio on Ö3 with commentary by Martin Blumenau. The Austrian spokesperson, who announced the Austrian votes during the final, was Dodo Roscic.

Voting 
Below is a breakdown of points awarded to Austria and awarded by Austria in the semi-final and grand final of the contest. The nation awarded its 12 points to Croatia in the semi-final and to Serbia and Montenegro in the final of the contest.

Points awarded to Austria

Points awarded by Austria

References

External links
Austrian National Final page

2005
Countries in the Eurovision Song Contest 2005
Eurovision